Henry Hartley Fowler, 1st Viscount Wolverhampton,  (16 May 183025 February 1911) was a British solicitor and Liberal politician who sat in the House of Commons from 1880 until 1908 when he was raised to the peerage. A member of the Wesleyan Methodist Church, he was the first solicitor and the first Methodist to enter the Cabinet or to be raised to the peerage.

Early life
Fowler was born in Sunderland, the son of Rev, Joseph Fowler. He was educated at Woodhouse Grove School, Apperley Bridge, Bradford (1840–42) and later at St. Saviour's Grammar School, Southwark.

He moved to Wolverhampton and was admitted as a solicitor in 1852. He served as a local councillor and was Mayor of Wolverhampton in 1866. He was chairman of Wolverhampton School Board in 1870, and was a Deputy Lieutenant for Staffordshire and JP for Wolverhampton.

Political career
At the 1880 general election Fowler was elected as a Liberal Member of Parliament (MP) for the borough of Wolverhampton, a seat he held until the borough was divided under the Redistribution of Seats Act 1885. He then was then returned at the 1885 general election as the MP for Wolverhampton East, and held that seat until he was ennobled in 1908. He served under William Ewart Gladstone as Under-Secretary of State for the Home Department from 1884 to 1885, as Financial Secretary to the Treasury in 1886 and as President of the Local Government Board from 1892 to 1894 and under Lord Rosebery as Secretary of State for India from 1894 to 1895. In 1886, he was sworn of the Privy Council.

Fowler later held office under Sir Henry Campbell-Bannerman and H. H. Asquith as Chancellor of the Duchy of Lancaster between 1905 and 1908. The latter year he was raised to the peerage as Viscount Wolverhampton, of Wolverhampton in the County of Stafford, and served under Asquith as Lord President of the Council until 1910. He was widely thought of as a future Prime Minister of the United Kingdom, but his ill health prevented this.

In his approach to policymaking, according to Neil Smith, Sir Henry Fowler (who became Viscount Wolverhampton in 1908) was supportive of reform legislation in the areas of pensions, education, and the Poor Law. According to his private secretary, however, he did not have “the patience to suffer Radical and Labour members gladly.”

He was an elected President of The Law Society 1901–02.

Lord Wolverhampton died on 25 February 1911, aged 80.

Family
Fowler married Ellen Thorneycroft, daughter of ironmaster and first Mayor of Wolverhampton, George Benjamin Thorneycroft, in 1857. They had a son and two daughters.

Their son Henry succeeded to the viscountcy. Their daughters were the authors the Hon. Ellen Thorneycroft Fowler and the Hon. Edith Henrietta Fowler (who wrote a biography of her father).

Viscountess Wolverhampton's great nephew was Peter Thorneycroft.

Arms

References

Oxford Dictionary of National Biography – Fowler, Henry Hartley

External links 

 
 

Wolverhampton
Wolverhampton
People from Sunderland
Politicians from Tyne and Wear
People educated at St Olave's Grammar School
Wolverhampton
Wolverhampton
Knights Grand Commander of the Order of the Star of India
Wolverhampton
Wolverhampton
Wolverhampton
Wolverhampton
Presidents of the Law Society of England and Wales
Liberal Party (UK) MPs for English constituencies
UK MPs 1880–1885
UK MPs 1885–1886
UK MPs 1886–1892
UK MPs 1892–1895
UK MPs 1895–1900
UK MPs 1900–1906
UK MPs 1906–1910
UK MPs who were granted peerages
People from Wolverhampton
Mayors of Wolverhampton
Methodist Church of Great Britain people
People of the Victorian era
Peers created by Edward VII